Calleagris kobela, the Mrs Raven's flat or Mrs Raven's skipper, is a butterfly of the family Hesperiidae. It is found in South Africa, in Afromontane forests from the eastern Cape along the Amatolas and coastal forests to KwaZulu-Natal up to the midlands.

The wingspan is 42–44 mm for males and 43–45 mm for females. There is one generation in late summer with peaks from February to March.

References

Butterflies described in 1864
Tagiadini
Butterflies of Africa
Taxa named by Roland Trimen